Two ships of the Polish Navy have been named ORP Bielik:

 , a  
 , a  acquired in 2003

Polish Navy ship names